Column South is a 1953 American Western film directed by Frederick de Cordova and starring Audie Murphy and Joan Evans.

Plot
In 1861, prior to the American Civil War, a Union officer (Audie Murphy), tries to prove local Navajo Indians are innocent of killing a prospector. He has to fight the anti-Indian attitudes of his superior officer (Robert Sterling) and north–south tensions within the soldiers. He discovers Confederate sympathizers are planning to cause the Indians to go on the warpath for their own benefit.

Cast
 Audie Murphy as Lt. Jed Sayre
 Joan Evans as Marcy Whitlock
 Robert Sterling as Capt. Lee Whitlock
 Ray Collins as Brig. Gen. Storey
 Dennis Weaver as Menguito
 Gregg Palmer as Chalmers (as Palmer Lee)
 Russell Johnson as Corp. Biddle
 Jack Kelly as Trooper Vaness
 Johnny Downs as Lt. Posick
 Bob Steele as 1st Sgt. McAfee
 James Best as Primrose
 Ralph Moody as Joe Copper Face
 Rico Alaniz as Trooper Chavez

References

External links
 
 
 

1953 films
Audie Murphy
1953 Western (genre) films
American Western (genre) films
Western (genre) cavalry films
Universal Pictures films
American Civil War films
Films directed by Frederick de Cordova
1950s English-language films
1950s American films